Loren Wulfsohn (born 16 September 1968) is a former synchronized swimmer from South Africa.

References 

1968 births
Living people
South African synchronised swimmers
Olympic synchronised swimmers of South Africa
Synchronized swimmers at the 1992 Summer Olympics